Nik Shahr castle is a historical castle located in Nik Shahr County in Sistan and Baluchestan Province, The longevity of this fortress dates back to the Parthian Empire.

References 

Castles in Iran
Parthian castles